Swan Christian College is a non-denominational, co-educational Christian primary and secondary school located in the Swan Valley of Western Australia. The college has over 1,500 students from Kindergarten to Year 12. Swan Christian College is part of the Swan Christian Education Association (SCEA), and a member of the Association of Independent Schools of Western Australia (AISWA).

History 
Swan Christian College was founded in 1983 (under the name of Swan Christian High School) and first commenced operations on a vacated Seventh Day Adventist high school campus in Victoria Park before moving to its newly constructed Middle Swan campus in 1986.

In 1995, Midland Christian School moved from Midland to the Middle Swan campus, and in 1997 the school officially changed its name to Swan Christian College to become a K-12 school with the Junior, Middle and Senior School campus that is in place today.

Governance and structure 
Swan Christian College is one of seven schools that are part of the Swan Christian Education Association (SCEA). The college's K-12 campus in the Swan Valley, WA includes an online school and Trade Training Centre. Swan Christian College is registered on the Commonwealth Register of Institutions and Courses for Overseas Students (CRICOS) as an Australian education provider that recruits, enrols and teaches overseas students (CRICOS provider code: 00459J).

Western Australian academic ranking 
The following table summarizes Swan Christian College's Median Australian Tertiary Admission Rank (ATAR) ranking in recent years:

The following table summarizes Swan Christian College's WACE achievements in recent years:

References 

Private primary schools in Perth, Western Australia
Private secondary schools in Perth, Western Australia
Nondenominational Christian schools in Perth, Western Australia
Educational institutions established in 1983